Eternity Memorial Complex is a memorial located in Chișinău, the capital of Moldova. The memorial is located along P. Halippa Street (formerly Marshal Malinovsky Street). It is dedicated to Soviet soldiers who died in the Second Jassy–Kishinev Offensive.

History 
In Soviet times the complex was known as the Victory Memorial. The monument was made on May 9, 1975 in honour of the Soviet soldiers who died in the Great Patriotic War. The monument was restored on August 24, 2006, marking the 62nd anniversary of the Second Jassy–Kishinev Offensive.

Description 
The central part of the memorial is a pyramid of five 25-meter tall stone rifles. A 5-pointed star with an eternal flame in the center of the monument. The monument is guarded by an honor guard from the Moldovan Army that changes guard hourly. Wreath-laying ceremonies are regularly held at the center of the memorial on national holidays. On August 1, 2016, the Central Bank of Russia issued a five-ruble coin from the series "Cities — capitals of states liberated by the Soviet troops from Nazi invaders", dedicated to Chisinau, the reverse of which depicts the memorial in honor of the Second Jassy–Kishinev Offensive. The number of copies is two million.

Gallery

References 

Monuments and memorials in Chișinău
1975 sculptures
Soviet military memorials and cemeteries